The Kungey Alatau (Küngöy Ala-Too; , Küngei Alataw), also spelled Kungoy Ala-Too, and Kungey Alataw, is a mountain range, which forms the Northern Tien Shan with Zailiyskiy Alatau. 
The word "Alatau" or "Ala-too" means "variegated mountains", a designation indicating a pronounced high-altitude zone of mountains, partly white due to snow, partly dark on snowless areas. The word "Kungey" or "Kyungei" means "the side (of the mountain) facing to the South".

Description 
It borders the basin in which Lake Issyk-Kul is located from the north (the same basin bounded by the Terskey Ala-Too ridge from the south). The Zailiysky Alatau stretches parallel to the ridge from the north. The Kungey Alatau and Zailiysky Alatau are separated in the west by the valley of the Chon-Kemin, the main tributary of the Chu River, and in the east by the valley of the Chilik, a tributary of the Ili River. The Chilik-Kemin Bridge connecting the two ridges separates the Chon-Kemin and Chilik valleys. The border of Kazakhstan and Kyrgyzstan, which runs along the Zailiysky Alatau ridge in the west, passes over the Chiliko-Kemin Bridge to the Kungey Alatau ridge. Thus, the ridge to the west of the bridge is located in Kyrgyzstan, and to the east of the bridge it passes the border of Kyrgyzstan and Kazakhstan.

The range begins in the west in the area of the Boom Gorge of the Chu River, where it adjoins the Kyrgyz Ala-Too. Here begins the highest central part of the ridge. The highest point is Choktal - , to the east of which is the Boztyri peak. Here the Kumbel ridge leads off in a southeasterly direction. The largest river of the southern slope of the Kungey Alatau, Chon-Ak-Suu, which flows into Issyk-Kul, begins at this point and flows in an easterly direction, so that the northern slope of its valley is the main ridge of the Kungey Alatau, and the southern ridge of the Kumbel. Then the Chon-Ak-Suu valley turns to the south and enters the Semyonovsky gorge. From the Keminsky peak massif, the Chiliko-Kemin Bridge runs to the north-west.

The climate of the Northern Tien Shan is continental. The coldest month is January, and the warmest is July. At low altitudes, there is a forest (mainly Tien Shan spruce), and then from  there is a subalpine zone, even higher — glaciers. 
Here there are four of the most famous and visited lakes of the Almaty Region: three Kolsay lakes and Lake Kaindy in the gorges of the Kolsay and the Kaindy.
 
The Kungey ridge is interesting in mountaineering terms, as a little "conquered" ridge. Of the 150 peaks of the range, only 40 were conquered. Climbers have never visited the  section from the Zharbulak river valley to the Talda valley.

References
 The Geographical names of the world (Географические названия мира: Топонимический словарь. — М: АСТ. Поспелов Е. М. 2001)
 Жетытор // Казахстан. Национальная энциклопедия. — Алматы: Қазақ энциклопедиясы, 2005.
 V.N. Vukolov - The North West Tien Shan (Вуколов В. Н. По Северному Тянь-Шаню: Горные туристские маршруты по Заилийскому Алатау и Кунгей Алатау / Рец.: мастер спорта СССР А. Ф. Харченко. — М.: Профиздат, 1991. — 208 с. — (Библиотечка самодеятельного туриста). — 15 000 экз. — .
 V.N. Vukolov - The mountains touristic trails (Вуколов В. Н. По Северному Тянь-Шаню: горные туристские маршруты по Заилийскому Алатау и Кунгей Алатау: Учебное пособие. — Изд 2-ое, испр. и доп. — Алматы, 2006. — 344 с.) 

Mountain ranges of Kyrgyzstan
Mountain ranges of Kazakhstan
Mountain ranges of the Tian Shan